The 2022–23 afternoon network television schedule for the four major English-language commercial broadcast networks in the United States covers the weekday and weekend afternoon hours from September 2022 to August 2023. The schedule is followed by a list per network of returning and cancelled shows from the 2021–22 season. The daytime schedules for the four major networks that offer afternoon programming are expected to remain consistent with the prior television season.

Affiliates fill time periods not occupied by network programs with local and/or syndicated programming. PBS – which offers daytime programming through a children's program block, PBS Kids – is not included, as its member television stations have local flexibility over most of their schedules and broadcast times for network shows may vary. Also not included are MyNetworkTV and The CW (as the programming services also does not offer daytime programs of any kind other than non consistent weeks of sporting events), and Ion Television (as its schedule is composed mainly of syndicated reruns).

Fox is not included on the weekday schedule. Fox only airs afternoon programming (in the form of sports content) on weekends.

Legend

Schedule
New series are highlighted in bold.
All times correspond to U.S. Eastern and Pacific Time scheduling (except for some live sports or events). Except where affiliates slot certain programs outside their network-dictated timeslots, subtract one hour for Central, Mountain, Alaska, and Hawaii-Aleutian times.
Local schedules may differ, as affiliates have the option to pre-empt or delay network programs. Such scheduling may be limited to preemptions caused by local or national breaking news or weather coverage (which may force stations to tape delay certain programs in overnight timeslots or defer them to a co-operated station or digital subchannel in their regular timeslot) and any major sports events scheduled to air in a weekday timeslot (mainly during major holidays). Stations may air shows at other times at their preference.
All sporting events air live in all time zones in U.S. Eastern time, with local and/or primetime programming by affiliates after game completion.
CBS's Afternoon programming is scheduled to be preempted on March 16-19, 23, 24 and 26 and April 1 for the network’s coverage of 2023 March Madness.

Weekdays

Notes:
 ABC stations have the option of airing General Hospital at 2:00 or 3:00 p.m. Eastern Time, depending on the station's choice of feed.
 Depending on their choice of feed, CBS stations have the option of airing Let's Make a Deal at either 10:00 a.m. or 3:00 p.m. Eastern (airtime adjusted by time zone), and/or The Young and the Restless at 11:00 or 11:30 a.m. local time (in the Central, Mountain, and Pacific time zones).
 NBC and ABC stations have the option of airing their corresponding network's Midday newscast anytime between 12:00-2:00 p.m. Eastern Time, depending on the station's choice of feed.

Saturday 

Notes:
 To comply with FCC educational programming regulations, stations may defer certain programs featured in their respective network's E/I program blocks to determined weekend late morning or afternoon time periods if a sporting event is not scheduled in the timeslot or in place of paid programming that would otherwise be scheduled.
 Airtimes of sporting events may vary depending on the offerings scheduled for that weekend.
 NBC Nightly News airs in the Eastern and Central Time zones when Notre Dame Football on NBC does not air a 3:30 p.m. ET game.
CBS Weekend News airs in the Eastern and Central time zones when SEC on CBS does not air a 3:30 p.m. ET game.

Sunday

Notes:
 To comply with FCC educational programming regulations, stations may defer certain programs featured in their respective network's E/I program blocks to determined weekend late morning or afternoon time periods if a sporting event is not scheduled in the timeslot or in place of paid programming that would otherwise be scheduled.
 Airtimes of sporting events may vary depending on the offerings scheduled for that weekend. 
 When CBS and/or Fox offer an early singleheader NFL game, a post-game show airs after the game from 4:30–5:00 p.m. ET (the length of which may vary depending on the timing of the early game's conclusion) with local, syndicated or non-NFL sports programming airing after from 5:00–7:00 p.m. ET. Meanwhile, when CBS and/or Fox offer a late singleheader NFL game, local, syndicated or non-NFL sports programming airs from 1:00–4:00 p.m. ET/10:00 a.m.–1:00 p.m. PT.
 ABC, CBS and/or NBC stations may air their corresponding network's early evening newscast at 6:00 or 6:30 p.m. ET and PT/5:00 or 5:30 p.m. CT/MT, depending on the station's choice of feed.
 NBC Nightly News airs live in all time zones during Fall to avoid pre-emption due to the live airing of NBC Sunday Night Football.
 CBS Weekend News airs on the Eastern and Central time zones at 6:30 p.m. ET/5:30 p.m. CT when NFL on CBS does not air late NFL games. All other time zones air the program regardless of receiving or not a late game.

By network

ABC

Returning series:
ABC News
ABC World News Tonight
GMA3: What You Need To Know
ESPN on ABC
College Football Scoreboard
ESPN College Basketball on ABC
ESPN College Football on ABC
NBA Countdown
NBA Sunday Showcase
NHL on ABC 
WNBA on ABC
XFL
General Hospital

CBS

Returning series:
The Bold and the Beautiful
CBS Evening News
CBS Sports
College Basketball on CBS
The NFL Today
NFL on CBS
PGA Tour on CBS
SEC on CBS/College Football on CBS
The Talk
The Young and the Restless

Fox

Returning series:
Fox Sports
Fox College Football
Fox College Hoops
Fox NFL Sunday
NASCAR on Fox
NASCAR RaceDay

NBC

Returning series:
NBC Nightly News
NBC Sports
Golf Channel on NBC
IndyCar on NBC
NASCAR America
NASCAR on NBC
Notre Dame Football on NBC
Premier League on NBC

New series:
NBC News Daily

Not returning from 2021–22:
Days of Our Lives (moved to Peacock)

Renewals and cancellations

Series renewals

ABC
NHL on ABC—Renewed for a tenth season on March 10, 2021; deal will into a fourteenth season in 2027.
XFL—Renewed for a third season on May 17, 2022; deal will into a sixth season in 2027.

CBS
NFL on CBS—Renewed through the 2032–33 season on March 18, 2021.
SEC on CBS—Renewed for a twenty-eighth  season; deal will into a twenty-ninth season in 2023.
The Young and the Restless—Renewed through the 2023–24 season on January 30, 2020.

Fox
Fox NFL Sunday—Renewed through the 2032–33 season on March 18, 2021.
NASCAR on Fox—Renewed through the 2023–24 season on August 2, 2013.

NBC

See also
 2022–23 United States network television schedule (prime-time)
 2022–23 United States network television schedule (morning)
 2022–23 United States network television schedule (late night)
 2022–23 United States network television schedule (overnight)

Notes

References

Sources 
 
 
 

United States weekday network television schedules
2022 in American television
2023 in American television